You, You're a History in Rust is the fifth album from Do Make Say Think. It was released on February 12, 2007 in Europe and February 26, 2007 in the rest of the world. The album features vocals on two tracks, "A with Living" and "In Mind," a first for the band.

Kerrang! ranked it as one of the 16 greatest post-rock releases of all-time.kerrang

Track listing

Personnel

Do Make Say Think
 Ohad Benchetrit – guitar, keyboard, horns
 Dave Mitchell – drums
 James Payment – drums
 Justin Small – guitar, keyboard
 Charles Spearin – guitar, bass, keyboard, horns

Other musicians
 Brian Cram – horns
 Mr. Jay Baird – horns
 Julie Penner – violin
 Jason Tait – vibraphone
 Deekus – marimba
 Alex Lukashevsky – vocals
 Tony Dekker – vocals
 Jimmy Anderson – musical saw
 Liyat Benchetrit – piano
 Akron/Family (Seth, Ryan, Dana, Miles) – vocals on track 2

Technical
 Do Make Say Think – producer
 Katia Taylor – front and back photographs
 James Payment – "Bike" photograph
 Eleanor Kure – "Buddy" (dog) photograph
 Yochana Benchetrit – painting
 Ananuku Kolar – artwork layout

References

External links
 Constellation Records website

2007 albums
Do Make Say Think albums
Constellation Records (Canada) albums